Temitope Solaja is a Nigerian film actress, screenwriter and film producer.

Early life and education
Temitope Solaja born first child of her parents is a native of Sagamu, Ogun State. She holds a bachelor's degree in Mass communication from Tai Solarin University of Education.

Career
In 2008, Solaja got her first acting role in the movie titled Bamitale. The movie, Opolo produced by Sola Akintunde Lagata shot her into  limelight because of her sub-lead role in 2009. In 2015, she wrote and produced her own movie titled Aruga in which she also starred alongside other actors like Antar Laniyan, and Sunkanmi Omobolanle.

In 2017, she was nominated as Best Actress in a Leading Role (Yoruba) in the 2017 Best of Nollywood Awards.

Filmography
Bamitale
Opolo
Idemu Ojo kan
The Antique
Adajo Aiye
Kudi Klepto
Bella
Firepemi
Aruga
Darasimi
Awelewa
Orente
Juba
77 Bullets

Awards and nominations

References 

Nigerian film actresses
Living people
Nigerian film producers
Year of birth missing (living people)
Nigerian screenwriters
Actresses in Yoruba cinema
21st-century Nigerian actresses
Nigerian women film producers
Yoruba actresses
Yoruba filmmakers
Actresses from Ogun State